The Barnard Astronomical Society is an amateur astronomical society based in Chattanooga, Tennessee.

The society's name came from the recently deceased, distinguished Tennessee astronomer Edward Emerson Barnard.

Web Site 
Barnard Astronomical Society Website

See also 
 List of astronomical societies

References 

Amateur astronomy organizations
Organizations established in 1923
Organizations based in Tennessee